Khem Bunthai (born 3 November 1985), also known by his stage name Khemarak Sereymun, is a Cambodian singer, actor and Brand Ambassador is known as a judge and a member of the Audit Committee, which evaluates the reality of the Judge Audition on X Factor Cambodia.

Music career

Introduction to songs in U2 Entertainment 2003–2007 

In 2003, Khemarak Sereymun was selected by U2 Entertainment to sing in the production, and the first song that rocked U2 Production at the time and pushed him to rise to fame in the art world was "Heart of a Boxer." This song also made him a lot of support and many people began to know his name as a newcomer star and the next song is" as well as "Prom Tang ahlai" song "Prolit Bat Beong" are all songs  Which received overwhelming support at the time. Until 2007, U2 Entertainment also announced the closure of its production due to bankruptcy due to competition and the size of the loss on the copying of U2 production to put on the market.

Participation in Sunday Production 2008–2016 

After the production of U2 Entertainment closed its company.  Later, during 2008, Khemarak Sereymun joined Sunday Production, he continued to release albums as well as beautiful cover songs such as "Worried with the Moon" "I was wrong" "Leave the opportunity Some of you can" "Get a French husband" "Farmers also have dollars ", including some sweet songs released during the Khmer New Year, such as 
"Want a wife" and "Lost shoes". Sereymun also sang abroad, especially at the Cambodia-Thailand Friendship Concert to celebrate the 60th anniversary of Cambodian-Thai relations. In November 2010, he performed in Bangkok, Thailand. Khemarak Sereymun also went on to perform in the United States on August 17, 2011, with his sister (Khemarak Srey Pov), his singing partner in the Sunday production together for two months in that. Khemarak Sereymun also participated in the third large-scale Khmer film of Sunday Production, "Vampire" was opened and  Officially released on November 21, 2012. Finally, he left Sunday Production in 2016 and joined Reaksmey Hang Meas Production in 2017, a giant production and one of the leading productions in Cambodia.

Participation in Reaksmey Hang Meas Production 2017-Present 

In 2017, Khemarak Sereymun joined Reaksmey Hang Meas Production. After taking refuge under the roof of Hang Meas production of singer Khemarak Sereymun is not easy, also immediately exploded support for the song, The first song released in this new production is "Stung Treng Bong Ery". Until 2018, Khemarak Sereymun wakes up his audience with a handshake with Thai veteran singer Tik Shiro, whose collaboration song is titled  "Sad Man" and the two also sang together on the stage with a broadcast on Thai TV Channel 3.

Achievements

|-
| 1999 
| Top 1 Singer Nestlé-Cambodia
| Apsara TV-11 
| 
| Nestlé-Cambodia
| 
|-
| 2011
| Best Male Singer of Cambodia
| Anachak Dara Awards
| 
| Sabay Company
| 
|-
| 2013
| Cambodia Top Singer 
| Anachak Dara Awards
| 
| Sabay Company
| 
|}

Discography

Solo albums

Partner Albums

Performances
 2013: Christmas Concert on Hang Meas HDTV
 2014: K-POP Dream Concert on ETV Cambodia
 2015: Coca-Cola Concert on MYTV
 2016: Carabao Tour Concert on Hang Meas HDTV
 2017: Phum Angkor Concert on Hang Meas HDTV

TV Show 
 Judge of "X factor Cambodia Season 1" 2019 with his co-worker at Hang Meas Production Aok Sokunkanha, Nop Bayyareth, Sok Seylalin

References

External links
 

21st-century Cambodian male singers
Living people
1985 births